Playlouder was a digital music and media company. providing news, reviews, and other music-related content. It also claimed to be the world's first music service provider— an Internet service provider bundling access to music content along with broadband Internet access.

The company also presented the world's first virtual music festival in partnership with Glastonbury Festival in 2001, and has been online partner for Glastonbury Festival since 2000, webcasting full performances from bands including Gorillaz, Blur, Basement Jaxx, The White Stripes, Orbital, Coldplay, The Flaming Lips, Sigur Rós, Franz Ferdinand, Muse, and Bloc Party.

History
Playlouder.com was founded in the UK in 2000 by Paul Hitchman and Jim Gottlieb, who ran the record labels Sugar and Candy in the 1990s. The site ran news and reviews, as well as providing digital music delivery. 

In 2003, Playlouder and The state51 Conspiracy formed Playlouder MSP — an ISP offering broadband Internet access combined with unlimited legal music downloading and other music applications for a monthly subscription fee. The service, touted as an alternative to unauthorized file-sharing services, licensed the right for its subscribers to legally share music and in return paid royalties to music rights owners. Dizzee Rascal, The White Stripes, and Stereophonics were early adopters, as well as labels such as Ninja Tune and Beggars Group.

Playlouder MSP was awarded the Popkomm IMEA award for innovation in 2004, later announcing deals with EMI and Sony BMG, as well as the UK indie label association AIM and the UK’s leading collection society PRS for Music. Commercial launch of the service was scheduled for the summer of 2007.

References

External links
 
 

Mass media companies established in 2000
Internet properties established in 2000
British music websites
Companies based in the London Borough of Wandsworth